Romy Teitzel (born 23 February 1999) is an Australian rugby league footballer who plays for the Newcastle Knights in the NRL Women's Premiership. She previously played for the Brisbane Broncos in the NRL Women's Premiership and the North Queensland Gold Stars in the QRL Women's Premiership.

Background
Teitzel was born in Townsville, Queensland and played her junior rugby league for the Tully Tigers. Her father, Craig, played first grade for the Western Suburbs Magpies, Illawarra Steelers, Warrington Wolves and North Queensland Cowboys.

Playing career
In 2019, while playing for the Western Lions, Teitzel represented Queensland Country at the Women's National Championships.

In March 2020, Teitzel joined the North Queensland Gold Stars for their inaugural season, playing in their first game before the season was cancelled. She later played for the Wests Panthers in the Holcim Cup.

In September 2020, she joined the Brisbane Broncos in the NRL Women's Premiership. In Round 3 of the 2020 NRL Women's season, she made her debut for the Broncos in their 24–16 win over the Sydney Roosters.

In September 2021, Teitzel was named the BHP Premiership Player of the Year.

On 3 December 2021, Teitzel signed with the Newcastle Knights to be a part of their inaugural NRLW squad. In February 2022, she was announced as the on-field captain.

In round 1 of the delayed 2021 NRL Women's season, Teitzel made her club debut for the Knights against the Parramatta Eels.

On 2 October 2022, Teitzel played in the Knights' 2022 NRLW Grand Final win over the Parramatta Eels, scoring a try in the Knights' 32-12 victory.

References

External links
Newcastle Knights profile
Brisbane Broncos profile

1999 births
Living people
Australian female rugby league players
Rugby league second-rows
Rugby league fullbacks
Rugby league centres
Brisbane Broncos (NRLW) players
Newcastle Knights (NRLW) players
Newcastle Knights (NRLW) captains